Karel Pilař (born December 23, 1977) is a Czech former professional ice hockey defenceman who played 90 games in the National Hockey League for the Toronto Maple Leafs between 2001 and 2004. The rest of his career, which lasted from 1999 to 2018, was mainly spent in the Czech Extraliga. Internationally he played for the Czech national team at the 2001 World Championship, winning a gold medal.

Playing career
Pilař made his North American hockey debut during the 2001–02 NHL season, playing 52 games for the St. John's Maple Leafs of the AHL and earning himself a promotion to their parent club, the Toronto Maple Leafs, for the remainder of the season.

The following season, Karel's career was jeopardized when a viral infection attacked his heart and sidelined him on two occasions. However, he fought back from his illness to play in 50 games for Toronto in the 2003–04 NHL season.

With the NHL season canceled in 2004–05, Pilař returned home to play in his home town for HC Sparta Praha, scoring a career high of 13 goals and helping his club win the Czech Extraliga title.

Unfortunately for Pilař, he suffered a relapse of the heart condition that had plagued him three years earlier, forcing him to miss the majority of the next two seasons. Once healthy, Pilař returned to North American ice 2007, playing the final 10 games of the season with the Toronto Marlies of the AHL.

Seeking an opportunity for an NHL comeback, Pilař signed with the Atlanta Thrashers for the 2007–2008 season. After being claimed by the Chicago Blackhawks from waivers during training camp and re-claimed by the Thrashers, he was assigned to their AHL affiliate, the Chicago Wolves. On January 14, 2009 he left Metallurg Magnitogorsk and returned to the Czech Republic, where he signed a contract to play for Sparta Praha.

Having played for HC Litvínov of the Czech Extraliga as well as HC CSKA Moscow and Lev Poprad of the KHL after that, he signed a half-year contract with the Växjö Lakers of the Swedish Elitserien (SEL) on January 30, 2012.

Career statistics

Regular season and playoffs

International

References

External links
 
 Forecaster.ca Profile

1977 births
Living people
HL Anyang players
Chicago Wolves players
Czech ice hockey defencemen
Czech expatriate ice hockey players in Russia
HC CSKA Moscow players
HC Donbass players
HC Lev Poprad players
HC Litvínov players
Metallurg Magnitogorsk players
HC Most players
St. John's Maple Leafs players
HC Sparta Praha players
Ice hockey people from Prague
Stadion Hradec Králové players
Toronto Maple Leafs draft picks
Toronto Maple Leafs players
Toronto Marlies players
Växjö Lakers players
Czech expatriate ice hockey players in Canada
Czech expatriate ice hockey players in the United States
Czech expatriate ice hockey players in Sweden
Czech expatriate sportspeople in Ukraine
Czech expatriate sportspeople in South Korea
Expatriate ice hockey players in South Korea
Expatriate ice hockey players in Ukraine